The 2019–20 London City Lionesses F.C. season was the club's first season in existence following a breakaway from Millwall Lionesses in May 2019. The team competed in the FA Women's Championship, the second level of the women's football pyramid, as well as two domestic cup competitions: the FA Cup and the League Cup.

On 13 March 2020, in line with the FA's response to the coronavirus pandemic, it was announced the season was temporarily suspended until at least 3 April 2020. After further postponements, the season was ultimately ended prematurely on 25 May 2020 with immediate effect. London City Lionesses sat in 4th at the time and retained their position on sporting merit after The FA Board's decision to award places on a points-per-game basis.

Squad
.

FA Women's Championship

Results summary

Matches

League table

Women's FA Cup

As a member of the top two tiers, London City Lionesses entered the FA Cup in the fourth round, losing to FA WSL team Reading in their opening fixture.

FA Women's League Cup

Group stage

Squad statistics

Appearances 

Starting appearances are listed first, followed by substitute appearances after the + symbol where applicable.

|-
|colspan="14"|Players who appeared for London City Lionesses but left during the season:

|}

Goalscorers

Transfers

Transfers in

Loans in

Transfers out

Notes

External links 
 London City Lionesses official website

London City Lionesses